Collar Bomb is a 2021 Indian Hindi-language action thriller film directed by Dnyanesh Zoting and starring Jimmy Sheirgill. It was released digitally on Disney+ Hotstar.

Premise 
A glorified cop's life is thrown into chaos as he is forced to commit a series of crimes before a suicide bomber blows up a school. As he races against time, he's confronted by an evil that is hell-bent on striking raw, primal terror.

Cast 
 Jimmy Sheirgill as SHO Manoj Hesi
 Sparsh Srivastav as Shoeb Ali
 Rajshri Deshpande as Rita
 Asha Negi as ASI Sumitra Joshi
 Ajit Singh Palawat as Ratan Negi
 Naman Jain as Akshay Hesi
 Ajay Purkar as Commander Bhaskar Chandra
 Shashi Bhushan as Inspector Mohan Rawat
 Ambarish Deshpande as Deputy Commandant Satyan
 Vidushi Mehra as Sarah Fernandes
 Suman Singh as Peter Fernandes

Reception 
Jyoti Kanyal of India Today gave the film a negative review and stated "Dnyanesh Zoting's Collar Bomb is a disappointing thriller, which is devoid of logic and depth. Watch it if you don't have much else to do." Anna M.M. Vetticad of Firstpost gave the film 1.75 out of 5 stars and stated, "Will the Nikhil Nair who wrote her with such finesse and the Dnyanesh Zoting who directed her with such confidence please raise their hands and tell us what went wrong with the rest of Collar Bomb?" Archika Khurana of Times of India gave the film 3.5 out of 5 stars and stated, "As Jimmy Sheirgill says in the end, “Life is a chain that is built from the decisions we make.” This perfectly summing up this 87-minute riveting drama. It will have you hooked to your seat the entire time."

Pankaj Shukla of Amar Ujala gave the film 2.5 out of 5 stars and stated, "The film is fine for passing the time on weekends but its director Dnyanesh Zoting has raised a hope that if given a chance, he will definitely do a big bang."  Russel D'Silva of BollywoodLife gave the film 3 out of 5 stars and stated, "Collar Bomb is a quite a taut, tight thriller for three quarters of the way until the final quarter ergo the climax almost brings everything crashing down. Thankfully, Jimmy Sheirgill and surprise package Asha Negi prevent the movie from ending with too sour an aftertaste." Madhuri V of Filmibeat gave the film 2.5 out of 5 stars and stated, "The cop thriller keeps you majorly hooked until you foresee the climax from a distance. Later, when the big reveal is made, it simply fails to make a loud blast."

References

External links 
 

2021 action thriller films
Indian action thriller films
2020s Hindi-language films
2021 films
Disney+ Hotstar original films